Margaret Bullock may refer to

Margaret Bullock (journalist) (1845–1903), New Zealand journalist, writer, feminist and social reformer
Margaret Bullock (physiotherapist) (born 1933), Australian professor of physiotherapy and pioneer in the field of ergonomics